Brian Timothy Finn  (born 25 June 1952) is a New Zealand singer and musician. His musical career includes forming 1970s and 1980s New Zealand rock group Split Enz, a number of solo albums, temporary membership in his brother Neil's band Crowded House and joint efforts with Neil Finn as the Finn Brothers.

Early life
Brian Timothy Finn was born in Te Awamutu, New Zealand, weighing 10 pounds at birth, to parents Richard and Mary. At the age of 13, he went to Sacred Heart College, Auckland, a Catholic boarding school, on a scholarship. He has two sisters, and one younger brother Neil Finn.

Career

1972–1984: Split Enz

In 1971 Finn commenced a Bachelor of Arts degree at the University of Auckland. There he played in music practice room 129 (later the name of a Split Enz song) with friends and future Split Enz bandmembers Mike Chunn, Robert Gillies, Philip Judd and Noel Crombie. Music soon became more important to him than his studies. In 1972 he quit university. A few months later, Phil and Tim formed the group Split Ends, renamed Split Enz in 1975, shortly before they left New Zealand for Melbourne. Between 1975 and 1984, the group released nine studio albums.  Split Enz played its last show on 4 December 1984 in Auckland.

1981–present: Solo work
Finn had his first success away from Split Enz in 1981 when his discarded demo "They Won't Let My Girlfriend Talk to Me" became a top 10 hit for Australian band Jimmy and the Boys. In 1983, Finn recorded his debut solo album, Escapade, while still a member of Split Enz. This met with major commercial success both in Australia and New Zealand, and yielded hit song "Fraction Too Much Friction", which revealed a more rhythm-based sound than Split Enz had been known for. After contributing four songs to Split Enz album Conflicting Emotions, Finn left the band permanently in June 1984, to focus on a solo career.

In 1986 Finn released his second studio album, Big Canoe. The album utilised a wide variety of instrumentation, including guitars, orchestral backings and traditional Indian instruments - most notably on single "No Thunder, No Fire, No Rain", which was inspired by the Bhopal chemical disaster. Though Big Canoe reached number three on the New Zealand charts, it failed to become the international breakthrough that Finn or record company Virgin had hoped.

In 1987, Finn composed music for the Australian comedy Les Patterson Saves the World, which yielded the Australian hit "You Saved the World". Finn had a small part in Australian film The Coca-Cola Kid alongside then-girlfriend Greta Scacchi, and a larger one in her Italian-shot romance La Donna della Luna (The Moon Woman).

In late 1988, Finn recording his eponymous third album, Tim Finn, for Capitol Records. The album yielded strong reviews and the New Zealand hit "Parihaka", based on a Māori village known for its campaign of passive resistance to European occupiers.

In 2000, the album Together in Concert: Live was released, featuring Finn, and fellow New Zealand singer/songwriters Bic Runga, and Dave Dobbyn. Recorded in August and September 2000 in venues around New Zealand, the album saw the three performers each equitably showcased. Both the concerts and album feature all three performers providing vocal and instrumental backing on each other's songs. The album peaked at number 2 on the New Zealand chart.

In 2015, Finn composed further for theatre, with an opera Star Navigator commissioned by New Zealand Opera, Victorian Opera and West Australian Opera, and the musical Ladies in Black to premiere in Brisbane by Queensland Theatre Company in November 2015.

As England and New Zealand went into COVID-19 lockdown in 2020, Finn and Phil Manzanera began working collaboratively on an album under the name Tim Finn & Phil Manzenera, which is called Caught by the Heart. The album was released on 26 August 2021. The album is produced by the two of them, with Manzenera doing the lead instrumental and Finn doing the vocals.

1995–2005 : Finn Brothers

In 1989, Finn began playing music with younger brother Neil, for an intended Finn brothers record. After working together on some songs, Neil later proposed incorporating the tracks onto the latest album of Crowded House, the group he had formed after Split Enz dissolved. Tim co-wrote eight songs, including the hits "Weather with You" and "Four Seasons in One Day".

In 1993, both Tim and Neil were appointed Officers of the Order of British Empire, for services to music.

The Finn Brothers resumed their collaborative work and released Finn in 1995. A second and final album was released in 2004 titled, Everyone Is Here. A Mojo magazine review stated that it contained "some of the most haunting music to bear the Finn imprint".

2020–present: Forenzics 
In 2020 Finn co-created Forenzics with former Split Enz keyboardist Eddie Rayner. Forenzics is an experimental project with the debut album Shades and Echoes (2022) as a transformation of the songs of Mental Notes. Alongside Finn and Rayner are former members from the album, Noel Crombie and Phil Judd - and also Phil Manzanera who was involved in the redevelopment of Mental Notes into Second Thoughts. Initial singles "Chances Are" and "Premiere Fois" were officially released in November 2021, however "Walking", "Strange Stars" and "Abandoned" were all released before on YouTube (from early 2020 until early 2021).

Personal life
Finn was in a relationship with actress Greta Scacchi from 1983 to 1989.

Finn is currently married to television presenter Marie Azcona, formerly of MTV and TVNZ One's Music Week. Finn and Azcona have two children, and have collaborated on several songs, some of which are featured on Steel City, the dance show that Finn wrote. Aside from co-writing two tracks with Azcona, Finn collaborated on another with former Split Enz member Mike Chunn. Finn's son Harper is a musician in his own right.

Discography

Studio albums

Live albums

Soundtrack albums

Spoken word albums

Compilation albums

Singles

Charity singles

 This discography relates to releases by Tim Finn only. See also Finn Brothers' discography, Crowded House discography and Split Enz discography for other related works.

Awards

RIANZ Awards
The New Zealand Music Awards are awarded annually by the RIANZ in New Zealand.

ARIA Awards
The ARIA Music Awards are awarded annually by the Australian Recording Industry Association.

Countdown Australian Music Awards
Countdown was an Australian pop music TV series on national broadcaster ABC-TV from 1974 to 1987, it presented music awards from 1979 to 1987, initially in conjunction with magazine TV Week. The TV Week / Countdown Awards were a combination of popular-voted and peer-voted awards.

|-
|1981
| himself
| Best Australian Songwriter
| 
|-
| 1982
| himself
| Best Australian Songwriter
| 
|-
| rowspan="5" |1983
| Escapade
| Best Australian Album
| 
|-
| rowspan="2" | "Fraction too Much Friction" 
| Best Australian Single
| 
|-
| Best Video
| 
|-
| rowspan="2" | himself
| Songwriter of the Year
| 
|-
| Most Popular Male Performer
| 
|-
|1984
| himself
| Most Popular Male Performer
| 
|-
|1985
| himself
| Most Popular Male Performer
| 
|-

Helpmann Awards
The Helpmann Awards for live performance in Australia are awarded annually by Live Performance Australia.

References

External links

 
 
 Tim Finn's Official Website
 AudioCulture profile
 Tim Finn's MySpace site
 Fanclub endorsed site
 Australian Record Company site
 Trouser Press commentary on Crowded House, Neil Finn and Tim Finn discography
Elsewhere Tim Finn retrospective to 2009

1952 births
APRA Award winners
New Zealand people of Irish descent
Living people
New Zealand pop singers
New Zealand songwriters
Male songwriters
New Zealand expatriates in Australia
New Zealand expatriates in England
People from Te Awamutu
Crowded House members
Split Enz members
New Zealand Officers of the Order of the British Empire
People educated at Sacred Heart College, Auckland
20th-century New Zealand male singers
New Zealand singer-songwriters
New Zealand guitarists
New Zealand new wave musicians
New Zealand male guitarists
New Zealand pianists
Helpmann Award winners
20th-century New Zealand musicians
21st-century New Zealand musicians
21st-century New Zealand male singers
Tim
Male pianists
ALT (band) members
Māori-language singers